Russia–Slovenia relations are foreign relations between Russia and Slovenia.  Both countries established diplomatic relations on May 25, 1992.  Russia has an embassy in Ljubljana.  Slovenia has an embassy in Moscow and two honorary consulates (in Saint Petersburg and Samara). Until 2022, Russia had five honorary consuls in Slovenia, but Slovenia withdrew its consent to the appointments due to the Russian invasion of Ukraine. Both countries are full members of the Council of Europe and the Organization for Security and Co-operation in Europe.

In March 2011, Russian Prime Minister Vladimir Putin visited Slovenia and met with Slovenian Prime Minister Borut Pahor and President Danilo Türk. The Russian and Slovenian delegations discussed economic, scientific and cultural partnership, especially regarding the construction of the South Stream pipeline.

Bilateral relations were seriously affected in 2009 by external factors, namely the global financial and economic crisis led to the downturn of economic activities and lower consumption which, as a consequence, resulted in a significant down-slide in the trade between the two countries.
 
The structure  of the trade exchange during the crisis though remained largely the same: 60 to 70% of Slovenian exports are pharmaceuticals, wired communications systems, electrical equipment, mechanical installations and paints. Imports from Russia are mostly comprised by oil and gas products and their derivatives, aluminium products, together comprising 70 to 75% of the total Russian import. 

On 29 July 2021, Slovenian President Pahor and Russian President Putin declared Slovenia–Russia Friendship Day on 31 July 2021.

After the Euromaidan began in 2013 and later prolonged into the Russo-Ukrainian War, Slovenia has sided with Ukraine over territorial integrity. Slovenia urged a political solution to handle the problem. With the 2022 Russian invasion of Ukraine, together with other EU countries Slovenia has condemned the Russian aggression and has taken steps such as closing Slovenia's airspace to Russian flights and boycotting sports events held in Russia.

On the morning of 1 March 2022, a Russian missile 3M54-1 Kalibr struck Freedom Square in Kharkiv, Ukraine destroying the Slovene consulate in the city. In response, the Prime Minister of Slovenia Janez Janša said that the country will terminate all agreements with Russia relating to defence, security and political cooperation. The Slovenian Ministry of Foreign Affairs also summoned the Russian ambassador and handed over a diplomatic note of protest requesting an apology and compensation for the damages.

After the Russian invasion of Ukraine started, Slovenia, as one of the EU countries, imposed sanctions on Russia, and Russia added all EU countries to the list of "unfriendly nations". In spite of this, the import from Russia and export to Russia significantly increased in the following months in annual terms (in July, that was 6 times, respectively, 56%), according to Russian state media RIA Novosti.

On 24 October 2022, a photo of Slovenian nuclear waste was used to illustrate a propaganda communication by the Russian Defence Ministry regarding the alleged Ukrainian plans to construct a dirty bomb.

See also 
 Foreign relations of Russia
 Foreign relations of Slovenia
 Soviet Union–Yugoslavia relations

References

External links 

   Embassy of Russia in Ljubljana
  Embassy of Slovenia in Moscow

 
Slovenia
Bilateral relations of Slovenia